Rhabdophis ceylonensis is endemic to the island of Sri Lanka. The species is commonly known as the Sri Lanka blossom krait, the Sri Lanka keelback, and මල් කරවලා (mal karawala) or නිහලුවා  (nihaluwa) in Sinhala. It is a moderately venomous snake.

Distribution and habitat
Rhabdophis ceylonensis is a poorly-known snake from wet forests and some parts of intermediate forests in the lowlands and midhills of Sri Lanka.

Scalation
R. ceylonensis has dorsal scales in 19 rows at midbody. The ventrals number  131-141, the anal scale is divided, and the subcaudals number 40-54.

Ecology
R. ceylonensis is a slow-moving snake. When threatened, it raises the anterior part of its body, which it inflates to expose the red skin between the dorsal scales on its neck. Its diet consists of frogs, while hatchlings are known to eat orthopterans.

Reproduction
R. ceylonensis is oviparous. About 7 eggs are produced at a time, measuring 19-22 × 9.5-13.2mm (about .75 x .5 inch). They hatch in March to produce young measuring about  including tail.

Description
R. ceylonensis has a head distinct from the neck. The eye is large, with a round pupil. Its dorsal side is olive-brown in color, with black cross-bars that enclose a series of large yellow or red black-edged spots. Its interstitial skin is red. Nuchal glands extend along the anterior part of the body to the 15th ventral.

Venom
R. ceylonensis possesses a venom, and has been known to inflict life-threatening bites (termed, Hazard Level 1). Although it does not have hollow fangs in the front of the upper jaw, it does have two enlarged, curved, grooved teeth at the rear of each upper jaw.

References

External links
"Balanophis ceylonensis ". ITIS (Integrated Taxonomic Information System). https://www.itis.gov/servlet/SingleRpt/SingleRpt?search_topic=TSN&search_value=700778
"Balanophis ceylonensis ". archive.today. https://archive.today/20140629140050/http://www.natricines.com/balanophis.html

Further reading
Boulenger GA (1890). The Fauna of British India, Including Ceylon and Burma. Reptilia and Batrachia. London: Secretary of State for India in Council. (Taylor and Francis, printers). xviii + 541 pp. (Tropidonotus ceylonensis, p. 346).
Boulenger GA (1893). Catalogue of the Snakes in the British Museum (Natural History). Volume I., Containing the Families ... Colubridæ Aglyphæ. part. London: Trustees of the British Museum (Natural History). (Taylor and Francis, printers). xiii + 448 pp. + Plates I-XXVIII. (Tropidonotus ceylonensis, p. 252).
Günther A (1858). Catalogue of the Colubrine Snakes in the Collection of the British Museum. London: Trustees of the British Museum. (Taylor and Francis, printers). xvi + 281 pp. (Tropidonotus chrysargus Var. ceylonensis, new variety, p. 71).
Günther A (1864). The Reptiles of British India. London: The Ray Society. (Taylor and Francis, printers). xxvii + 452 pp. + Plates I-XXVI. (Tropidonotus ceylonensis, new status, pp. 268–269 + Plate XXII, figure G).
Smith MA (1938). "The nucho-dorsal glands of snakes". Proceedings of the Zoological Society of London, Series B. 107 (3): 575-583. (Balanophis, new genus, p. 583).
Smith MA (1943). The Fauna of British India, Ceylon and Burma, Including the Whole of the Indo-Chinese Sub-region. Reptilia and Amphibia. Vol. III.—Serpentes. London: Secretary of State for India. (Taylor and Francis, printers). xii + 583 pp. (Genus Balanophis, p. 310; species B. ceylonensis, pp. 310–311, Figure 98).
Wall F (1921). Ophidia Taprobanica or the Snakes of Ceylon. Colombo, Ceylon [Sri Lanka]: Colombo Museum. (H.R. Cottle, Government Printer). xxii + 581 pp. (Amphiesma ceylonensis, new combination, pp. 77, 103-105).

Reptiles of Sri Lanka
Rhabdophis
Taxa named by Albert Günther
Reptiles described in 1858